The United Volleyball Conference is a National Collegiate Athletic Association Division III men's volleyball conference located in the northeastern United States. Formed in August 2010 with play starting in January 2011, the conference operates out of the same offices as the all-sports Empire 8 league, though the two remain separate entities.

Teams

Current members
The league currently has 9 members.

Note that because NCAA men's volleyball is a spring sport, the year of joining is the calendar year before the first season of competition.

Future member

Former members

Championship history

See also

Volleyball

References

External links

United Volleyball Conference website
National Collegiate Athletic Association website
NCAA men's volleyball
NCAA Division III

NCAA Division III conferences
Volleyball organizations